Xanthomelanodes is a genus of bristle flies in the family Tachinidae. There are at least four described species in Xanthomelanodes.

Species
 Xanthomelanodes arcuatus (Say, 1829)
 Xanthomelanodes atripennis (Say, 1829)
 Xanthomelanodes californicus Townsend, 1908
 Xanthomelanodes flavipes (Coquillett, 1897)

References

Further reading

External links

 

Phasiinae